The 2020 WAFL Women's season was the second season of the WAFL Women's (WAFLW). The season commenced on 18 July and concluded with the Grand Final on 19 September 2020. The commencement of the season was delayed several months due to the impact of the COVID-19 pandemic.

Clubs

Ladder

Finals series

Qualifying and Elimination finals

Preliminary final

Grand Final

References

 
 
WAFLW season 2020
WAFLW season 2020
WAFLW season 2020